Rusty Bucket Restaurant & Tavern is an upscale casual tavern restaurant company headquartered in Columbus, Ohio. It was founded in 2002 by president and owner, Gary Callicoat. The company currently owns 22 restaurants in Ohio, Indiana, Michigan, North Carolina, and Florida.  Rusty Bucket Restaurant & Tavern is the sister company of Cameron Mitchell Restaurants.

Locations
Florida
Sarasota, Florida
Indiana
Indianapolis
Michigan
Bingham Farms, Michigan
Bloomfield, Michigan
Northville, Michigan
Northville Park Place, Northville, Michigan 
North Carolina
SouthPark, Charlotte, North Carolina
Ohio
Bexley, Ohio
Clintonville, Columbus, Ohio
Dayton, Ohio
Dublin, Ohio
Easton Town Center, Columbus, Ohio
Gahanna, Ohio
Hilliard, Ohio
Liberty Center, Ohio
Mason, Ohio
New Albany, Ohio
Rookwood, Cincinnati
Solon, Ohio
Westerville, Ohio
Worthington, Ohio

References

External links
 Rusty Bucket Restaurant & Tavern

Companies based in the Columbus, Ohio metropolitan area
Regional restaurant chains in the United States
Restaurants in Ohio